Stephen M. R. Covey is an American writer and public speaker and the author of the books: The SPEED of Trust, Smart Trust, and Trust & Inspire: How Truly Great Leaders Unleash the Greatness in Others.    He is the co-founder and CEO of a company called CoveyLink Worldwide and former President and CEO of Covey Leadership Center.

He received an MBA from Harvard Business School.

Personal
He is the son of the late Stephen R. Covey best known for The Seven Habits of Highly Effective People. He is married and has children. He was born in 1962. He is the Father of former University of Utah Wide Receiver Britain Covey.

References

American male writers
Harvard Business School alumni
American chief executives
American company founders
Living people
Year of birth missing (living people)